Small Town Girl may refer to:

Film 
 A Small Town Girl, a 1914 American silent drama film, considered to be lost, starring Lon Chaney Sr.
 Small Town Girl (1936 film), an American romantic comedy starring Janet Gaynor, Robert Taylor, and James Stewart
 Small Town Girl (1953 film), an American musical starring Jane Powell, Farley Granger, and Ann Miller

Music 
 Small Town Girl (album), a 2006 album by Kellie Pickler, or the title song
 "Small Town Girl" (song), a 1987 song by Steve Wariner
 "Small Town Girl", a song by Andy Bull
 "Small Town Girl", a song by Good Shoes from Think Before You Speak
 "Small Town Girl", a song by John Cafferty & The Beaver Brown Band from Tough All Over